The Cupedidae are a small family of beetles, notable for the square pattern of "windows" on their elytra (hard forewings), which give the family their common name of reticulated beetles.

The family consists of about 30 species in 9 genera, with a worldwide distribution. Many more extinct species are known, dating as far back as the Triassic. The family Ommatidae is considered a subfamily of Cupedidae by some authors, but ommatids have been found to more closely related to Micromalthidae in genomic analysis studies.

The larvae are wood-borers, typically living in fungus-infested wood, and sometimes found in wood construction. The larvae eat the fungus-infested dead wood or tree roots while the adults are believed to subsist on pollen and plant sap.

Males of Priacma serrata (western North America) are notable for being strongly attracted to common household bleach. This suggests that compounds in bleach may resemble attractive compounds found by the beetle in nature.

Taxonomy 

 Adinolepis Neboiss, 1984 Australia
 Ascioplaga Neboiss, 1984 New Caledonia
 Cupes Fabricius, 1801 Europe, China Paleogene, North America, Recent
 Distocupes Neboiss, 1984, Australia
 Paracupes Kolbe, 1898, South America
 Priacma LeConte, 1874 Myanmar, Cretaceous, North America, Recent
 Prolixocupes Neboiss, 1960 North America, South America
 Rhipsideigma Neboiss, 1984 Madagascar, East Africa
 Tenomerga Neboiss, 1984 East and Southeast Asia, New Guinea, North America, South Africa

Fossil genera 
After Kirejtshuk, Nel &  Kirejtshuk, 2016.
 †Anaglyphites Ponomarenko 1964 Karabastau Formation, Kazakhstan, Late Jurassic (Oxfordian/Kimmeridgian), Shar-Teg, Mongolia, Late Jurassic (Tithonian), Hengshan Formation, China, Dzun-Bain Formation, Mongolia, Zaza Formation, Russia, Early Cretaceous (Aptian)
 †"Anaglyphites" pluricavus Soriano and Delclos 2006 La Pedrera de Rúbies Formation, Spain, Early Cretaceous (Barremian)
 †Apriacma Kirejtshuk et al. 2016 Yixian Formation, China, Aptian
 †Asimma Ponomarenko 1966 Madygen Formation, Kyrgyzstan, Late Triassic
 †Barbaticupes Jarzembowski et al. 2017 Burmese amber, Myanmar, Late Cretaceous (Cenomanian)
 †Cainomerga Kirejtshuk et al. 2016 Menat Formation, France, Paleocene
 †Cretomerga Kirejtshuk et al. 2016 Yixian Formation, China, Aptian
 †Cupopsis Kirejtshuk et al. 2016 New Jersey amber, Late Cretaceous (Turonian)
 †Cupidium Ponomarenko 1968 Karabastau Formation, Kazakhstan, Oxfordian/Kimmeridgian
 †Ensicupes Hong 1976 Dalazi Formation, Guyang Formation, China, Aptian
 †Furcicupes Tan and Ren 2006 Yixian Formation, China, Aptian
 †Gracilicupes Tan et al. 2006 Daohugou, China, Middle Jurassic (Callovian)
 †Kirghizocupes Ponomarenko 1966 Madygen Formation, Kyrgyzstan, Late Triassic
 †Latocupes Ren and Tan 2006 Yixian Formation, China, Aptian
 †Mallecupes Jarzembowski et al. 2017 Burmese amber, Myanmar, Cenomanian
 †Menatops Kirejtshuk et al. 2016 Menat Formation, France, Paleocene
 †Mesocupes Martynov 1926 Karabastau Formation, Kazakhstan, Oxfordian, Las Hoyas, Spain, Barremian
 †Miocupes Ponomarenko 1973 Cypris Formation, Czech Republic, Miocene
 †"Platycupes" sogdianus Ponomarenko 1966 Madygen Formation, Kyrgyzstan, Late Triassic
 †"Priacma" sanzii Soriano and Delclos 2006 Las Hoyas, Spain, Barremian
 †Priacmopsis Ponomarenko 1966 Zaza Formation, Russia, Aptian
 †Pterocupes Ponomarenko 1966  Madygen Formation, Kyrgyzstan, Late Triassic
 †Taxopsis Kirejtshuk et al. 2016 Baltic amber, Eocene

References

External links
 Tree of Life

 
Beetle families